Ajitesh Argal (born 21 September 1988 in Bhopal) is an Indian cricketer. He is a right-handed medium pace bowler and lower-order batsman. Argal was a member of the Indian U-19 cricket team that won the 2008 U/19 Cricket World Cup tournament played in Malaysia. He was the man of the match in the final, for taking 2 wickets for 7 runs in his 5 overs.

Argal was contracted by the Kings XI Punjab for the Indian Premier League 2008. Later Argal was recruited as an Inspector in Income Tax department through sports quota.

See also
2008 U/19 Cricket World Cup
Indian U-19 cricket team

References

External links
Cricinfo profile - Ajitesh Argal
CricketArchive

1988 births
Living people
Indian cricketers
Punjab Kings cricketers
Baroda cricketers